Miguel de Almeida Silva Duarte Nascimento (born 19 January 1995) is a Portuguese swimmer. He competed in the men's 100 metre freestyle event at the 2017 World Aquatics Championships. At club level, he competes for Benfica. , he holds the national record in the 400 metres freestyle, with a mark of 3:51.89.

References

External links
 

1995 births
Living people
Swimmers at the 2018 Mediterranean Games
S.L. Benfica (swimming)
Place of birth missing (living people)
Portuguese male freestyle swimmers
Mediterranean Games competitors for Portugal
20th-century Portuguese people
21st-century Portuguese people
Mediterranean Games medalists in swimming
Mediterranean Games silver medalists for Portugal
Swimmers at the 2022 Mediterranean Games